Bryan Gaul (born August 10, 1989 in Naperville, Illinois) is an American soccer player who most recently played for FSV Zwickau in the 3. Liga.

Career

College and Amateur
Gaul played college soccer for Bradley University between 2008 and 2011. During his time at Bradley, Gaul was named NSCAA All-Midwest Region and All-Missouri Valley Conference in 2011. In 2010 Gaul was named All-Missouri Valley Conference in his first year as a forward, after converting from a midfielder.

Professional
Gaul was selected by the LA Galaxy in the first round (19th overall) of the 2012 MLS Supplemental Draft. He made his debut for the club on May 2 against Seattle Sounders FC. Gaul made 14 appearances in 2012, along with 7 starts and notched an assist.

After loan stints in 2013 with NASL clubs Fort Lauderdale Strikers and Carolina RailHawks, Gaul was waived by the Galaxy on in the 2014 preseason.

Gaul had signed with USL club Saint Louis FC ahead of the 2015 season. He tied for the team high in both goals (4) and assists (4) during the 2015 regular season, and was the team's leading scorer overall that year with 6 goals, adding a pair of goals during U.S. Open Cup play.

Germany
In January 2016, Gaul moved to Germany and signed with Bahlinger SC of the Regionalliga Südwest. He moved to Kickers Offenbach for the 2016–17 season before signing with SV Elversberg ahead of the 2017–18 campaign.

On May 29, 2018 it was announced that Gaul moved up to the 3. Liga, signing a two-year contract with FSV Zwickau on a free transfer. He left the club at the end of the 2018/19 season.

Honors

Club
Los Angeles Galaxy
 MLS Cup (1): 2012

Personal life
In December 2018, he married Andreea Cristina Bolbea, a lifestyle blogger, model, and internet personality that has amassed over 900,000 followers on Instagram. She was born June 7, 1987, in Bucharest, Romania.

References

External links
 
 

1989 births
Living people
American soccer players
Bradley Braves men's soccer players
GPS Portland Phoenix players
LA Galaxy players
Fort Lauderdale Strikers players
North Carolina FC players
Saint Louis FC players
Kickers Offenbach players
Soccer players from Illinois
Sportspeople from Naperville, Illinois
LA Galaxy draft picks
USL League Two players
Major League Soccer players
North American Soccer League players
USL Championship players
American expatriate soccer players in Germany
Regionalliga players
Association football defenders
Association football midfielders
3. Liga players
Bahlinger SC players
American expatriate soccer players